The men's 10 metre air rifle was a shooting sports event held as part of the Shooting at the 1984 Summer Olympics programme. It was the first time the event was held at the Olympics. The competition was held on August 3, 1984 at the shooting ranges in Los Angeles. 54 shooters from 35 nations competed.

Results

References

Shooting at the 1984 Summer Olympics
Men's events at the 1984 Summer Olympics